The Black River Local School District is a public school district that covers north eastern Ashland County, south eastern Lorain County and south western Medina County, Ohio, United States, based in Sullivan, Ohio.

Schools
The Black River Local School District has one elementary school, one middle school, and one high school. There are two facilities that students are housed in, the Black River Education Center (BREC) houses the elementary and middle school students and then the high school is in another building.

Elementary school
Black River Elementary School

Middle school
Black River Middle School

High school
Black River High School

References

External links

Black River Local School District
School districts in Ohio